Gabriel Fallon (1898–10 June 1980) was an Irish theatre critic, actor and theatre director.

He was born in Dublin and joined the Civil Service in 1914. He became an actor in the Abbey Theatre, where he remained until 1930 when he started to spend more time on journalism. He was drama critic for the Irish Monthly, Catholic Standard and Evening Press.

In 1946 he produced "Katie Roche"  and in 1947 "Wife to James Whelan" , by Irish playwright Teresa Deevy. These were both Raidió Teilifís Éireann productions.

He was director of the Abbey Theatre from 1959 to 1974, his production involvement can be seen in the Abbey Theatre archives

He was married with six children. A devout Catholic, Fallon was an early member of An Ríoghacht.

Playography 
 Katie Roche  1946
 Wife to James Whelan  1947

References

External links 
 Gabriel Fallon at The Abbey Theatre Archive
 Gabriel Fallon at The Teresa Deevy Archive

1898 births
1980 deaths
Irish theatre critics
Irish male stage actors
Irish theatre directors
People from Drumcondra, Dublin